The Order of the Star of the Socialist Republic of Romania, from 1948 to 1965 the Order of the Star of the Romanian People's Republic, was the second-highest honor bestowed by the Socialist Republic of Romania (known as the Romanian People's Republic from 1947 to 1965). Established on 12 January 1948, during the regime's first month, it came in five classes:

Recipients
Recipients of its first class included Siegfried Wolfinger (1952), Lucia Sturdza-Bulandra (1953), Emil Bodnăraș, Justinian Marina, Gala Galaction (1954), Dimitrie Cuclin (1955), Simion Stoilow (1957), Alexandru Kirițescu, László Szabédi, Petre Antonescu, Cicerone Theodorescu (1958), N. Gh. Lupu, Károly Kós (1959), Tudor Arghezi (1960), Ion S. Gheorghiu, Gheorghe Macovei, Erasmus Julius Nyárády, Horia Maicu, George Oprescu, Mihail Jora, Miron Radu Paraschivescu (1961), Ion Agârbiceanu, Nicolae Profiri, Aurel Beleș, Corneliu Miklosi, Ion Jalea, Patriarch Alexy I of Moscow, Perpessicius (1962), Leontin Sălăjan (1963), Nikita Khrushchev (1964), Nicolae Giosan (1971 and 1981) Soeharto (1982) and Kim Il-sung (1982).

Recipients of its second class included Corneliu Baba, Alexandru Bârlădeanu, Mihai Beniuc, Geo Bogza, George Călinescu, Alexandru Ciucurencu, Nicolae Corneanu, George Georgescu, Athanase Joja, Barbu Lăzăreanu, and Gheorghe Mihoc.

Dumitru Coliu received both classes, in 1948 and 1957, respectively.

Notes

References
Florica Dobre, Liviu Marius Bejenaru, Clara Cosmineanu-Mareș, Monica Grigore, Alina Ilinca, Oana Ionel, Nicoleta Ionescu-Gură, Elisabeta Neagoe-Pleșa, Liviu Pleșa, Membrii C.C. al P.C.R. (1945–1989). Dicționar. Bucharest: Editura Enciclopedică, 2004.  

Romanian decorations
 
Awards established in 1948
Awards disestablished in 1989
Socialist Republic of Romania